Assyria may refer to:

Assyria, an ancient empire in Mesopotamia
Either of two provinces of the Persian Empire:
Achaemenid Assyria, also known as Athura
Asuristan (Sassanid)
Assyria (Roman province), province of the Roman Empire
Asoristan, the Sassanid province
Assyrian homeland, the homeland of the Assyrian people within which Assyrian civilisation developed.
A modern term referring to the establishment of a state for the Assyrian people, see Assyrian independence movement.
Assyria Township, Michigan
Assyrian Neo-Aramaic, the commonly spoken language by the modern Assyrians

See also
Assyrian (disambiguation)
Syria (disambiguation)
Ashur (disambiguation)
Name of Syria
Names of Syriac Christians
Beth Nahrain